Gustav Basson (born 23 February 1996) is a South African cyclist, who currently rides for South African team Team DMS Pro Cycling.

Major results

2014
 1st  Time trial, National Junior Road Championships
2015
 African Games
1st  Team time trial
2nd  Time trial
 3rd Time trial, National Under-23 Road Championships
 KZN Autumn Series
6th PMB Road Classic
6th Hibiscus Cycle Classic
2018
 1st  Overall Tour de Limpopo
1st  Young rider classification
1st Stages 1 & 3 (TTT)
 3rd Road race, National Under-23 Road Championships
 5th 100 Cycle Challenge
 African Road Championships
10th Road race
10th Time trial
2019
 1st  Overall Challenge International du Sahara Marocain
1st  Points classification
1st Stage 3
 Les Challenges de la Marche Verte
1st GP Al Massira
4th GP Oued Eddahab
 1st Stage 2 Tour of Good Hope
 1st Stage 1 Tour de Limpopo
 9th 100 Cycle Challenge
2021
 African Road Championships
1st  Mixed team relay
1st  Team time trial
 1st Stage 10 Tour du Faso
 5th Time trial, National Road Championships
2022
 African Road Championships
1st  Time trial
2nd  Team time trial
5th Road race
 1st Stage 3 Tour of Sakarya
 5th Grand Prix Cappadocia
 5th Grand Prix Develi

References

External links
 
 
 

1996 births
Living people
South African male cyclists
African Games gold medalists for South Africa
African Games medalists in cycling
Competitors at the 2015 African Games
African Games silver medalists for South Africa
20th-century South African people
21st-century South African people